The Allwetterzoo Münster is a Zoo in Münster in Westfalen, Germany.

The Zoo origins in the 1875 founded, and 1973 closed Zoologische Garten zu Münster, replaced by the 1974 founded Allwetterzoo Münster, which was built in a tree-rich area close to the lake Aasee.

Animal numbers 
This table shows the development of animal numbers in the Zoo until 2015

Management 

Until the end of the 1950s was the chairman of the board the official director, but since 1960 the title is Zoo director. Since 1985 is managed by Westfälischer Zoologischer Garten GmbH .

Staff numbers 
During 2012 totally 85 persons (inclusive the management) was working in the zoo. From those most (46) worked as Zookeepers, 4 were busy in an education programme, eleven involved in commercial sale section, or in the technical section. Six gardners were tending the plants and six person worked in the management.

Visitor numbers 
The numbers of visitors are sorted in different years

See also 
 List of zoos in Germany

External links

 
 Münster Zoo at Zoo-Infos.de (in English)

References

Zoos in Germany
Zoos established in 1974
Zoological Garden
Zoological Garden